The Sassi di Matera are two districts (Sasso Caveoso and Sasso Barisano) of the Italian city of Matera, Basilicata, well-known for their ancient cave dwellings inhabited  since the Paleolithic period.

The "Sassi" have been described by Fodor's as "one of the most unique landscapes in Europe". Along with the park of the Rupestrian Churches, it was named a  World Heritage Site by UNESCO in 1993.

History

The Sassi originate from a prehistoric troglodyte settlement and are suspected to be among the first human settlements in Italy. There is evidence that people were living here as early as the year 7000 BC.

The Sassi are houses dug into the calcarenitic rock itself, which is characteristic of Basilicata and Apulia, locally called "tufo" although it is not volcanic tuff or tufa. The streets in some parts of the Sassi often run on top of other houses. The ancient town grew up on one slope of the ravine created by the Gravina river. The ravine is known locally as "la Gravina".

The term sasso derives from Latin saxum, meaning a hill, rock or great stone.

In the 1950s, the government of Italy forcefully relocated most of the population of the Sassi to areas of the developing modern city. Beset by extreme poverty and riddled with malaria, the unhealthy living conditions were considered inhuman and an affront to the modern new Italian Republic of Alcide De Gasperi. However, people continued to live in the Sassi, and according to the English Fodor's guide:

Until the late 1980s this was considered an area of poverty, since many of these houses were, and in some cases still are, uninhabitable. The current local administration, however, has become more tourism-oriented, and it has promoted the regeneration of the Sassi with the aid of the European Union, the government, and UNESCO. Today there are many thriving businesses, pubs, and hotels there, as described in an April 2015 article in The New Yorker.

Geography
The "Sassi" grew in the area of Murgia Plateau, extended between Apulia and Basilicata. Along with the "Civita" and the "Piano", the two Sassi form Matera's Old Town.

Culture

The Sassi are visually reminiscent of ancient sites in and around Jerusalem, and for this reason they have been used in many Christian-themed films, including The Gospel According to St. Matthew (Pier Paolo Pasolini, 1964), The Passion of the Christ (Mel Gibson, 2004), The Nativity Story (Catherine Hardwicke, 2006) and Ben-Hur (Timur Bekmambetov, 2016).

The Sassi di Matera serves as a critical clue in Dick Rosano's mystery, 'The Secret of Altamura.' They also appeared in Patty Jenkins's Wonder Woman (2017), serving as a location for the Amazons' city Themyscira, and Cary Joji Fukunaga's No Time to Die (2021), where a scene with James Bond's Aston Martin racing through was shot.

Music 
in 2016 the band Corde Oblique entitled a song "I sassi di Matera", in the album "I Maestri del Colore". The song is diveded in two parts, the first inspired by the so-called Sasso Barisano, and the second to the Sasso Caveoso.

Gallery

See also
Murgia
Falco naumanni
Museo-laboratorio della Civiltà Contadina (Museum-workshop of the Peasant Culture)

References

External links

Sassi's page on UNESCO website
Sassi di Matera (HD Webcam)
Sassi of Matera: what to know and what to visit
"Life is Beautiful - a travel music video"
ROBA FORESTIERA, 45 Minutes, Documentary Film on the Sassi di Matera, 2004
City Map
Tourist information

Archaeological sites in Basilicata
World Heritage Sites in Italy
Buildings and structures in Matera
Tourist attractions in Matera

de:Matera#Sassi
hu:Matera#Sassi di Matera